Tangadpally is a village and municipality in Ranga Reddy district, telangana, India. It falls under Chevella mandal.

References

Villages in Ranga Reddy district